Annika Tammela  (1 July 1979 – 26 June 2001) was an Estonian women's footballer. She was a member of the Estonia women's national football team from 1994–2000, playing 27 matches and scoring 1 goal. She died in traffic collision. She became the Estonian Women's Footballer of the Year in 1999.

References

1979 births
2001 deaths
Sportspeople from Pärnu
Estonian women's footballers
Women's association football midfielders
Estonia women's international footballers
Road incident deaths in Estonia